Hennadiy Moroz (born 27 March 1975) is a retired Ukrainian football defender who last played for FC Obolon Kyiv.

External links

 

1975 births
Living people
Footballers from Dnipro
Ukrainian footballers
Ukrainian expatriate footballers
Expatriate footballers in Austria
Ukraine international footballers
Ukraine under-21 international footballers
Ukrainian Premier League players
FC Dnipro players
FC Dnipro-3 Dnipropetrovsk players
FC Arsenal Kyiv players
FC Dynamo Kyiv players
FC Dynamo-2 Kyiv players
FC Obolon-Brovar Kyiv players
FC Kryvbas Kryvyi Rih players
Association football defenders